Poritia plateni  is an Indomalayan butterfly found on Sumatra, Borneo, Peninsular Thailand and in the Philippines that belongs to the lycaenids or blues family.

References

Poritia
Butterflies described in 1889
Butterflies of Asia
Taxa named by Otto Staudinger